The Cradle of Coaches is a nickname given to Miami University in Oxford, Ohio for its history of producing successful sports coaches, especially in football. Bob Kurz, a former Miami sports communications worker, popularized the term in a 1983 book, though the school's association with the nickname goes as far back as the early 1960’s. Miami frequently inducts former coaches into the Cradle of Coaching Association for their feats as alumni.

Personnel 
The program's largest cohort are football coaches Earl Blaik, Paul Brown, Woody Hayes, Bill Arnsparger, George Little, Weeb Ewbank, Sid Gillman, Ara Parseghian, Bo Schembechler, John Pont, Carmen Cozza, Bill Mallory, Jim Tressel, Joe Novak, Ron Zook, Dick Crum, Paul Dietzel, Bill Narduzzi, Randy Walker, John Harbaugh, Nobby Wirkowski, Gary Moeller, Larry Smith, Dick Tomey, Terry Hoeppner, and Sean McVay.

Miami has also produced notable basketball coaches Darrell Hedric, Randy Ayers, Herb Sendek, Thad Matta and Sean Miller.  Hedric, currently a scout for the Toronto Raptors, is an Ohio and Cincinnati Basketball Hall of Famer and holds the record for Miami victories.  Ayers was a four-year starter for Miami, leading the team to back-to-back NCAA appearances in 1977 and 1978, and later served as a head coach for Ohio State and assistant coach in the National Basketball Association.  Sendek began his head coaching career at Miami and led the RedHawks to the postseason in each of his three seasons.  Matta, formerly the head coach at Ohio State, was an assistant under Sendek for one memorable year that included a regular season MAC championship and NCAA tournament appearance, and also for one year under then-head coach Charlie Coles. University of Tennessee basketball coach Ray Mears is also a graduate of Miami.

Baseball Hall of Fame manager Walter Alston is also a graduate of Miami.    Additionally, hockey coach George Gwozdecky served as head coach at Miami prior to leaving for Denver, where he won two national championships.

The Cradle of Coaches also was the subject of sports documentary film that aired on Time Warner Cable SportsChannel (Ohio) in 2015. The film captured the story of John Harbaugh's induction as well as perspective from other members.

Cradle of Coaches Association Inductees

Super Bowl winning former head coach John Harbaugh was inducted in their Hall of Fame in 2014.

The Mother of Coaches 
The McGuffey Reader, the Mother of Fraternities, The Miami Triad (Beta Theta Pi, Phi Delta Theta, Sigma Chi)..all these were attributed to Miami University (founded in 1809) in Oxford, Ohio.

In the fall of 1959, Bob Kurz, Sports Information Director and a recent graduate (1958)recounted that several Miami graduates were making history on the football field.  Louisiana State University under Paul Dietzel, ’48, was listed as number 1 in the country.

Northwestern University under Ara Parseghian, ’48 was number 2; Earl (Red) Blaik ’18 was leading Army to an undefeated season while Paul Brown ’30 was guiding the Cleveland Browns and Weeb Eubank ’28 was leading the Baltimore Colts.  Both pro teams were on top of their divisions.

It was a short leap from the ‘mother’ moniker to a cradle:  The next day Kurz wrote the phrase that has become synonymous with Miami University football, Miami of Ohio, the Cradle of Coaches. His book on the history of Miami's coaches was written in 1983.

The Cradle of Coaches sculpture group
A sculptural group called The Cradle of Coaches, by sculptor Kristen Visbal, was erected at Miami University between 2009 and 2011, with one addition in 2014. It consists of ten 120% lifesize statues of Earl Blaik, Paul Brown, Carm Cozza, Paul Dietzel, Weeb Ewbank, John Harbaugh, Ara Parseghian, John Pont, Bo Schembechler, and Thomas Van Voorhis.

See also
 List of Miami University people
 Miami RedHawks

References

External links
 Cradle of Coaches Archive, Miami University Libraries

Miami RedHawks football
Coaches of American football